Alexander Ireland may refer to:

 Alexander Ireland (boxer) (1901–1966), Scottish amateur and professional welter/middleweight boxer
 Alexander Ireland (journalist) (1810–1894) was a Scottish journalist, man of letters, and bibliophile